WWWZ (93.3 MHz) is a commercial FM radio station licensed to Summerville, South Carolina, and serving the Charleston metropolitan area and the South Carolina Lowcountry.  It is owned by Cumulus Media and broadcasts a Mainstream Urban radio format that plays R&B and Hip hop music.  Its radio studios and offices are on Faber Place Drive in North Charleston.  WWWZ carries the Premiere Networks syndicated morning show from New York City, The Breakfast Club.

WWWZ has an effective radiated power (ERP) of 50,000 watts.  The transmitter tower is on Radio Lane in Charleston near the Cooper River.  The station often refers to Charleston by its urban nickname "Chucktown".

Station history
WWWZ signed on the air May 10, 1974.  It was owned by Brothers Broadcasting and offered a Freeform Progressive Rock format.  The station broadcast from a mobile home studio off Hwy 61 near Summerville and was referred to as "3WZ". In 1981, WWWZ switched to a "CHUrban" rhythmic contemporary format as "The New Z93".

In summer 1999, Z93 added new hosts to "Big Mack and The All New Breakfuss Club", which finishing second in the morning ratings to WAVF's Howard Stern. Z93 had reached number one on several occasions but usually lost to WEZL. WWWZ was number one with 25-54 listeners in Fall 1999.

In Winter 2002, Z93 was number one overall and Tessa and Baby J stayed at number one in the morning with the 25-54 audience. In Spring 2002, Tessa and Baby J were number one with 18-34 listeners.

References

External links
Z-93's website

WWZ
Cumulus Media radio stations
Radio stations established in 1974
Mainstream urban radio stations in the United States